Kuh Lahru (also Romanized as Kūh Lahrū) is a village in Shamil Rural District, Takht District, Bandar Abbas County, Hormozgan Province, Iran. At the 2006 census, its population was 161, in 39 families.

References 

Populated places in Bandar Abbas County